Events in the year 1952 in the People's Republic of China.

Incumbents 
 Chairman of the Chinese Communist Party – Mao Zedong
 Chairman of the Government – Mao Zedong
 Vice Chairmen of the Government – Zhu De Liu Shaoqi, Song Qingling, Li Jishen, Zhang Lan, Gao Gang
 Premier – Zhou Enlai
 Vice Premiers – Dong Biwu, Chen Yun, Guo Moruo, Huang Yanpei, Deng Xiaoping

Governors  
 Governor of Anhui Province – Zeng Xisheng (starting unknown)
 Governor of Fujian Province – Zhang Dingcheng 
 Governor of Gansu Province – Deng Baoshan
 Governor of Guangdong Province – Ye Jianying 
 Governor of Guizhou Province – Yang Yong 
 Governor of Hebei Province – Yang Xiufeng then Lin Tie
 Governor of Heilongjiang Province – Yu Yifu then Zhao Dezun  
 Governor of Henan Province – Wu Zhipu 
 Governor of Hubei Province – Li Xiannian   
 Governor of Hunan Province – Wang Shoudao then Cheng Qian 
 Governor of Jiangsu Province – Tan Zhenlin (starting unknown)
 Governor of Jiangxi Province – Shao Shiping 
 Governor of Jilin Province – Zhou Chiheng then Li Youwen 
 Governor of Qinghai Province – Zhao Shoushan then Zhang Zhongliang 
 Governor of Shaanxi Province – Ma Mingfang (until November), Zhao Shoushan (starting November)
 Governor of Shandong Province – Kang Sheng 
 Governor of Shanxi Province – Lai Ruoyu then Pei Lisheng 
 Governor of Sichuan Province – Li Jingquan (starting September)
 Governor of Yunnan Province – Chen Geng 
 Governor of Zhejiang Province – Tan Zhenlin

Events

 January 26 - The Five-anti campaign was launched in an effort to rid Chinese cities of corruption and enemies of the state. It became an all out war against the bourgeoisie in China.
 April 11–15 – Chinese Civil War: Battle of Nanri Island
 October 14-November 25 – Korean War: Battle of Triangle Hill

Births
 January 2 – Ng Man-tat, Hong Kong actor (died 2021)
 March 25 – Jung Chang, Chinese-born author and historian
 May 13 – Wang Xiaobo, Chinese writer who became famous after his death (died 1997)
 August 28 – Zhang Xinfeng, police officer and minister
 Zhang Beisan
 Zheng Qingdian
 Ureltu
 Yiin Chii-ming

Deaths
 August 8 - Fan Wanzhang
 December 3 - Sun Shenlu
 Huang Jiguang
 Wang Weike
 Wang Jingguo
 Mao Zuquan
 Zhou Xuechang
 Wang Shijing

See also 
 1952 in Chinese film

References 

 
Years of the 20th century in China
China